Complicated is the twenty-third studio album by American country music artist Tanya Tucker, released on March 25, 1997. Instead of longtime producer Jerry Crutchfield, Tucker employed Gregg Brown to produce the album. One track hit the Top Ten in the Billboard Top Country Singles charts, the number 9 "Little Things." "Ridin' Out the Heartache" was the only other single to chart, at number 45. The album reached #15 on the Country Albums chart.

Track listing

Personnel
Compiled from liner notes.
Musicians
Tanya Tucker - vocals
 Sam Bacco - timpani
 Mike Brignardello - bass guitar, upright bass
 Pat Buchanan - acoustic guitar, electric guitar, slide guitar, background vocals
 Larry Byrom - acoustic guitar, electric guitar
 Alisa Carroll - background vocals
 J. T. Corenflos - acoustic guitar, electric guitar
 Larry Franklin - fiddle
 G3/Hamptone - percussion
 Mike Haynes - trumpet
 John Jorgenson - electric guitar, mandolin, mandocello
 Fats Kaplin - accordion
 Billy Livsey - clavinet, Rhodes piano, Hammond organ, harmonium, Vox organ, Wurlitzer electronic piano
 Dana McVicker - background vocals
 Greg Morrow - drums
 Nashville String Machine - strings
 Hargus "Pig" Robbins - piano
 Robby Turner - Dobro, steel guitar
 Steve Turner - drums, percussion
 Billy Joe Walker Jr. - acoustic guitar, electric guitar
 Reggie Young - electric guitar
Technical
 Gregg Brown - production
 Jim DeMain - vocal recording, overdubs
 Rob Feaster - recording, engineering
 John Hampton - mixing
 Mark Nevers - engineering
 Denny Purcell - mastering
 Mike Purcell - engineering

Charts

Weekly charts

Year-end charts

References

1997 albums
Tanya Tucker albums
Capitol Records albums